Bhakti Kulkarni (born 19 May 1992) is an Indian chess player. She received the FIDE titles of Woman Grandmaster (WGM) in 2012 and International Master (IM) in 2019.
She is the recipient of Arjuna Award for her contribution to chess

Biography
In 2011, she won the Asian Junior Chess Championship. In 2013, she was the first at the international women's chess tournament in Czech Republic — Open Vysočina. In 2016, she won the Asian Chess Women Championship.

Played for Indian team in the Women's Asian Team Chess Championship, in which she participated twice (2009, 2016). In the individual competition won the bronze (2009) medal.

References

External links
 
 
 

1992 births
Living people
Indian female chess players
Chess woman grandmasters
Recipients of the Arjuna Award